George Washington Council may be:

 George Washington Council (New Jersey)
 George Washington Council (Minnesota)